George Hugh Page (born May 17, 1910) was an American alpine skier who competed in the 1936 Winter Olympics. He was born in Cham, Switzerland. In 1936 he finished 13th in the alpine skiing combined event.

External links
 
 Alpine skiing 1936 
 

1910 births
Year of death missing
American male alpine skiers
Olympic alpine skiers of the United States
Alpine skiers at the 1936 Winter Olympics
People from Cham, Switzerland
Sportspeople from the canton of Zug